Manuel U. Lujan (February 17, 1912 – January 26, 1975) was an educator and a Democratic Party of Guam politician in Guam. Lujan served as a senator during the first ten terms of the Guam Legislature.

Early life

Lujan attended Guam High School and the Normal School. He was an extension student of the University of Hawaii.

Personal life
Lujan married Mariana Manglona Leon Guerrero in November 1941. Together, they raised 4 sons.

Guam Legislature
Lujan first successfully ran as a senator in the Guam Legislature in 1950 and was reelected to 9 consecutive terms.

Elections

Leadership
Vice Speaker, 4th Guam Legislature
Vice Speaker, 5th Guam Legislature
Vice Speaker, 6th Guam Legislature
Vice Speaker, 7th Guam Legislature

Civic Leadership
Organizer, Guam Boy Scouts (1944)
Chairman, American Red Cross (Guam Chapter, 1950-1951)

Later years and death

Legacy
The Guam public school Manuel U. Lujan Elementary School was named after Lujan in 1975, two years after its construction as Yona Elementary School.

References

External links
 

1912 births
1975 deaths
20th-century American politicians
Chamorro people
Guamanian Democrats
Members of the Legislature of Guam